The ISCB Innovator Award is a computational biology prize awarded annually to leading scientists who are within two decades post-degree, who consistently make outstanding contributions to the field, and who continue to forge new directions.
The prize was established by the International Society for Computational Biology (ISCB) in 2016 and is awarded at the Intelligent Systems for Molecular Biology (ISMB) conference. The inaugural recipient was Serafim Batzoglou.

Laureates
 2021 - Benjamin J. Raphael
 2020 - Xiaole Shirley Liu
 2019 - 
2018 - M. Madan Babu
2017 - Aviv Regev
2016 - Serafim Batzoglou

Other ISCB prizes
 Overton Prize - "for outstanding accomplishment to a scientist in the early to mid stage of his or her career"
 ISCB Senior Scientist Award - "members of the computational biology community who are more than 12 to 15 years post-degree and have made major contributions to the field of computational biology through research, education, service, or a combination of the three"

See also

 List of biology awards

References

Bioinformatics
Biology awards